is a marine transportation company based in Sado, Niigata, Japan, founded as Sado Shosen on February 3, 1913. And, in 1932, this company was established by merging three ferry companies that Sado Shosen, Etsusa Shosen and Niigata Kisen into Sado Kisen as a joint public-private venture for the first time in Japan. On March 31, 2022, a 66.54% of this company's shares are transferred to Michinori Holdings. Now, this company belongs to Michinori Holdings.

Routes
Sado Steam Ship has two routes which connect the mainland to Sado Island.
 Niigata – Ryotsu
 Naoetsu – Ogi (From spring to autumn)

Former routes
 Teradomari – Akadomari

Terminals
 
Sado Steam Ship operates from six terminals.
Niigata port terminal
Located in Chūō-ku, Niigata

Naoetsu port terminal
Located in Jōetsu

Teradomari port terminal
Located in Nagaoka

Ryotsu port terminal
Located in Sado

Ogi port terminal
Located in Sado

Akadomari port terminal
Located in Sado

Fleet
, the following ships are in service.

References

External links
 

Ferry companies of Japan
Companies based in Niigata Prefecture
Transport in Niigata Prefecture